Bret "Hitman" Hart — The Best There Is, The Best There Was, The Best There Ever Will Be is an illustrated autobiography by Calgary professional wrestler Bret Hart and co-written by Perry Lefko. It became a national bestseller in Canada. The preface was written by Hart's cousin Roddy Piper.

Background
Lefko first approached Hart's management about the book in 1998, and it went through numerous different phases until the incarnation which was eventually published. Hart has expressed that he wrote the book to remind people of many of his matches which were unavailable due to them being under the ownership of WWF whom Hart was on bad terms with at the time of the book's production and release.

Content
The books narrative is told majorly through images from Hart's career with text captions containing wrestling related anecdotes. Due to Hart's strained relationship with WWF at the time of the book's release no pictures from his time working there are included. There are also several family photos and features never-before-seen photos from a private collection. The book also includes Hart's written tribute to his brother Owen who died in a wrestling related accident in 1999.

The book features quotes and comments from Ric Flair, Curt Hennig, Sting, Hulk Hogan and Bill Goldberg.

Release and reception
 The book has an initial printing of 150.000 copies which beat the publisher; Stoddart's previous record which was at 20.000 copies. The president of Stoddart; Nelson Doucet said: "At the sales conference, the salespeople recognized that we had a winner, and we were too conservative with our 35,000 initial printing, It became very obvious, very quickly, that we had a very successful title on our hands. The initial reaction from the market has confirmed that. The initial 150,000 print run is just the beginning. The book appeals not only to traditional market but also to specialty markets." He added that Hart is a very popular figure and that his career was filled with a lot of controversy. After the release Hart went on a book signing tour.

Kirsty Quested of the Online World Of Wrestling stated that she believed the book did not give great intel into Hart's life and that most fans are better of waiting for Hart's following biography but also stated that the foreword by Roddy Piper was good.

Follow-ups
Hart wrote a second more well received book named Hitman: My Real Life in the Cartoon World of Wrestling in 2007. The book was at the time of its release one of the author Perry Lefko's two bestsellers, he would later go on to write several other books.

See also
 Hart family
 Hart Legacy Wrestling

References

Sources

External links
 Bret "Hitman" Hart: the best there is, the best there was, the best there ever will be, on openlibrary.org

2000 non-fiction books
Bret Hart
Canadian autobiographies
Professional wrestling autobiographies
Hart wrestling family books